CIGN-FM is a Canadian radio station, that broadcasts a French-language community radio format on the frequency 96.7 MHz (FM) in Coaticook, Quebec.

Owned by Radio coopérative de Coaticook, Coop de solidarité, the station received CRTC approval on October 27, 2009.

CIGN-FM started broadcasting over the Web on August 4, 2011 and on 96.7 FM May 2012.

The station is a member of the Association des radiodiffuseurs communautaires du Québec.

References

External links
www.cignfm.ca
 

Ign
Ign
IGN
Radio stations established in 2009
2009 establishments in Quebec